This is a list of people from or who live in Odisha, India.

Literature

Age of Sarala Yuga

Sarala Dasa (1465)
Atibadi Jagannath Das (c. 1491–1550)

Age of Upendra Bhanja

 Kabi Samrat Upendra Bhanja (C. 1688–1740)
 Kavisurya Baladev Rath (c. 1789 – 1845)

Age of Radhanath

 Fakir Mohan Senapati
 Gangadhar Meher
 Radhanath Ray
 Madhusudan Rao
 Nanda Kishore Bal
 Gourishankar Ray
 Nilakantha Das

Post colonial age
 Gangadhar Meher
 Sachidananda Routray
 Brajanath Rath

Poets and authors
 Annada Shankar Ray
 Brajanath Ratha
 Bibhuprasad Mohapatra
 Fakir Mohan Senapati
 Gangadhar Meher
 Hussain Rabi Gandhi
 Godabarish Mishra
 Gopabandhu Das
 Gopinath Mohanty
 Gourahari Das
 Jachindra Rout
 Jagadish Mohanty
 Jagannath Prasad Das (Saraswati Samman winner)
 Jayadeva
 Jayanta Mahapatra
 Madhusudan Rao
 Manasi Pradhan
 Manoj Das
 Manoranjan Das
 Manmohan Acharya
 Mayadhar Mansingh
 Mohammed Ayoob
 Nilakantha Das
 Oopali Operajita
 Pratibha Satpathy
 Pratyush Prakash
 Radhanath Ray
 Ramakanta Rath
 Ranjan Das
 Ramakrushna Nanda
 Sachidananda Raut Ray
 Sarala Dasa
 Sarala Devi
 Sarojini Sahoo
 Satya Narayan Bohidar
 Sitakanta Mohapatra (Jnanpith Award winner)
 Tapan Kumar Pradhan

Writers and novelists
 Artabalabha Mohanti
 Bibhuprasad Mohapatra
 Brajanath Ratha
 Gita Mehta
 Gopinath Mohanty (Jnanpith Award winner)
 Haldhar Nag
 Kalindi Charan Panigrahi
 Krushna Chandra Kar
 Manoj Das
 Pratibha Ray
 Rajendra Prasad Das
 Shantanu Kumar Acharya
 Surendra Mohanty
 Uday Satpathy

Women's writing and feminism
Sarala Devi
Archana Nayak
Annapurna Maharana
Manasi Pradhan
Nandini Sahu
Sarojini Sahoo

Children's literature
Adikanda Mahanta
Bibhuprasad Mohapatra
Krutibas Nayak
Ramakrushna Nanda
Dash Benhur
Nilakantha Das

Drama and plays
Gopal Chhotray
Manoranjan Das
Biswajit Das

Short stories
Fakir Mohan Senapati
Surendra Mohanty
Manoj Das
Jagadish Mohanty
Sarojini Sahoo

Popular science
Binod Kanungo
Gokulananda Mohapatra
Dr. Ramesh Chandra Parida
Kamalakanta Jena
Bibhuprasad Mohapatra
Mayadhar Swain

Education and Research
Satyabadi Era

 Gopabandhu Das
 Nilakantha Das
 Godabarish Mishra

Later Period
 Baidyanath Misra
 Bhubaneswar Behera
 Bidhu Bhusan Das
 Prabhat Nalini Das
 Madhu Sudan Kanungo
 Keshab Chandra Dash
 Madhab Chandra Dash
 Ranjan Dash
 Prafulla Kumar Jena
 Baisali Mohanty
 Jitendra Nath Mohanty
 Saraju Mohanty
 Oopali Operajita
 Prana Krushna Parija
 Nikhil Mohan Pattnaik
 Jogesh Pati
 Arun K. Pati
 Sam Pitroda
 Amiya Pujari
 Ashok Swain

Artists

Actresses
 Anisha Ambrose
 Anu Chowdhury
 Archita Sahu
 Barsha Priyadarshini
 Bijaya Jena
 Jyoti Mishra
 Mahasweta Ray
 Naina Das
 Nandita Das
 Rameshwari
 Sulagna Panigrahi
 Tandra Ray
 Kavya Keeran
 Rajeswari Ray
 Pupul Bhuyan

Actors

 Akash Das Nayak
 Anubhav Mohanty
 Arindam Roy
 Atal Bihari Panda
 Babushaan Mohanty
 Bijay Mohanty
 Buddhaditya Mohanty
 Chandan Kar
 Chandrachur Singh
 Dipanwit Dashmohapatra
 Dukhiram Swain
 Hara Patnaik
 Jayiram Samal
 Mihir Das
 Papu Pam Pam
 Prashanta Nanda
 Sabyasachi Mishra
 Sadhu Meher
 Sarat Pujari
 Siddhanta Mahapatra
 Sisir Misra
 Sriram Panda
 Uttam Mohanty
 Mohammad Mohsin

Dancers

Modern
 Rajasmita Kar
 Prince Dance Group

Odissi Gurus and Dancers
 Gangadhar Pradhan
 Geeta Mahalik
 Kelucharan Mohapatra
 Mayadhar Raut
 Sanjukta Panigrahi
 Saswat Joshi
 Sujata Mohapatra
 Sunanda Patnaik
 Oopali Operajita
 Kumkum Mohanty
 Baisali Mohanty

Filmmakers
 Mohammad Mohsin
 Mehmood Hussain
 Bijoy Ketan Mishra
 Hara Patnaik
 Mira Nair
 Nila Madhab Panda
 Nitai Palit
 Prashanta Nanda
 Ravi Kinagi
 Sabyasachi Mohapatra
 Sadhu Meher
 Sisir Mishra
 Jitendra Mishra

Painters
 Jatin Das
 Jayanta Meher
 Kailash Chandra Meher

Sand artists
 Sudarshan Pattnaik

Sculptors
 Raghunath Mohapatra
 Sudarshan Sahoo

Singers
 Akshaya Mohanty
 Bhikari Bal
 Arabinda Muduli
 Krishna Beura
 Pratyush Prakash
 Sarbeswar Bhoi
 Sikandar Alam
 Sniti Mishra
 Sona Mohapatra
 Sunanda Patnaik
 Rituraj Mohanty
 Jitendra Haripal

Musicians
 Akshaya Mohanty
 Prafulla Kar
 Arabinda Muduli

Designers
 Bibhu Mohapatra

Jurists
 Ananga Kumar Patnaik; Former Justice of the Supreme Court of India
 Gopal Ballav Pattanaik; Former Chief Justice of India
 Ranganath Misra; Former Chief Justice of India
 Dipak Misra;  Chief Justice of India

Chief Executive Officers
 T.K.Chand, Chairman and Managing Director of NALCO

Professionals

Bankers
Ashok Kumar Sarangi
Harun Rashid Khan

Engineers
 Bibhusita Das

Managers
 Sarthak Behuria
 Sandip Das
 Subroto Bagchi
 Dr Tapan Kumar Pradhan
 Ranjan Dash

Physicians
 B. K. Misra (Neurosurgeon)
 Ramakanta Panda (Cardiovascular Surgeon)

Journalists
 Bibhuti Bhushan Nayak (Journalist)
 Gopal Mishra

Government civil servants
 Anugraha Narayan Tiwari (Former CIC of India)
 Lalit Mansingh
 Prajna Paramita
 Ramakanta Rath
 Sitakanta Mohapatra
 Dayanidhi Choudhury

Security and Law Enforcement  

 Pramod Kumar Satapathy

Religion
 Chaitanya Mahaprabhu
 Bhima Bhoi
 Jayadeva
 Atibadi Jagannath Das
 Achyutananda Das
 Durga Charan Mohanty

Freedom fighters

 Annapurna Maharana
 Afzal-ul Amin
 Baji Rout
 Birsa Munda
 Biswambhar Parida
 Bishwanath Das
 Bakshi Jagabandhu
 Chakhi Khuntia
 Ekram Rasul
 Ghanshyam Panigrahi
 Gopabandhu Das
 Godabarish Mishra
 Gurubari Meher
 Harekrushna Mahatab
 Jayee Rajguru
 Jagannatha Gajapati Narayana Deo II
 Jagabandhu Patnaik
 Kamal Singh
 Karunakar Singh
 Krushna Chandra Gajapati
 Laxman Nayak
 Madhab Chandra Routray
 Madho Singh (Ghess)
 Madhusudan Das
 Madhusudan Rao
 Malati Choudhury
 Nabakrushna Choudhuri
 Nilakantha Das
 Nityananda Mohapatra
 Parbati Giri
 Pindiki Bahubalendra
 Rama Devi
 Sarala Devi
 Subhas Chandra Bose
 Sayeed Mohammed
 Veer Surendra Sai

Rulers
Avakinnayo Karakandu
Chullakalinga
Kalinga II
Kharavela
Satrubhanja
Kaundinya I
Hemangada
Sivakara Deva I
Ramachandra Deva I
Tribhuvana Mahadevi I
Anantavarman Chodaganga
Anangabhima Deva III
Narasingha Deva I
Kapilendra Deva
Purushottama Deva
Prataparudra Deva
Jagannatha Gajapati Narayana Deo II
Krushna Chandra Gajapati
Basudeb Sudhal Deb
Ramai Deva
Balarama Deva
Vishwanath Dev Gajapati
Vikram Dev III
Sriram Chandra Bhanj Deo

Politicians

 Amarnath Pradhan
 Ananga Udaya Singh Deo
 Ananta Nayak
 Archana Nayak
 Arjun Charan Sethi
 Afzal-ul Amin
 Badri Narayan Patra
 Bhakta Charan Das
 Gopanarayan Das
 Bhartruhari Mahtab
 Bhupinder Singh
 Bibhu Prasad Tarai
 Bijayananda Patnaik
 Bijoy Mohapatra
 Biju Patnaik
 Bikram Keshari Deo
 Binayak Acharya
 Biren Mitra
 Bishwanath Das
 Braja Kishore Tripathy
 Chandra Sekhar Sahu
 Chintamani Panigrahi
 Draupadi Murmu
 Godabarish Mishra
 Gourahari Naik
 Giridhar Gamang
 Habibullah Khan
 Harekrushna Mahatab
 Hari Har Swain
 Hemananda Biswal
 Hrushikesh Naik
 Hussain Rabi Gandhi
 Janaki Ballabh Patnaik
 Jayaram Pangi
 Jitu Patnaik
 Jual Oram
 Kalikesh Narayan Singh Deo
 Kamakhya Prasad Singh Deo
 Laichan Nayak
 Laxman Tudu
 Maheswar Baug
 Mohan Jena
 Nabakrushna Choudhuri
 Nabin Nanda
 Nandini Satpathy
 Naveen Patnaik
 Nilakantha Das
 Nityanand Kanungo
 Nilamani Routray
 Niranjan Patnaik
 Nityananda Pradhan
 Parsuram Majhi
 Pinaki Misra
 Pradeep Kumar Majhi
 Prasanna Acharya
 Prasanna Kumar Patasani
 P.V.Narasimha Rao
 Pyarimohan Mohapatra
 Rabi Ray
 Radhanath Rath
 Rajendra Narayan Singh Deo
 Ranjib Biswal
 Rudramadhab Ray
 Sadashiva Tripathy
 Samarendra Kundu
 Sanatan Mahakud
 Sangeeta Kumari Singh Deo
 Sanjay Bhoi
 Sarala Devi
 Siddhanta Mahapatra
 Soumya Ranjan Patnaik
 Srikant Kumar Jena
 Surendra Mohanty
 Sudam Marndi
 Surendra Mohanty
 Sushila Tiriya
 Tathagata Satpathy
 V.V. Giri
 Baikunthanath Swain

Social service
 Baba Balia
 Sarala Devi
 Madhusudan Das
 Gopabandhu Das
 Farhat Amin
 Manasi Pradhan
 Begum Badar un nissa Akhtar

Sports

Cricket
 Alok Jena
 A. Panda
 Baljit Singh
 Basant Mohanty
 Bibhudutta Panda
 Kadambini Mohakud
 Biplab Samantray
 Debashish Mohanty
 Ranjib Biswal
 Sanjay Raul
 Shiv Sunder Das
 Natraj Behera

Hockey
 Binita Toppo (female hockey)
 Dilip Tirkey
 Lazarus Barla
 Ignace Tirkey
 Birendra Lakra

Other sports
 Anuradha Biswal (100m hurdles, running)
 Budhia Singh (long distance running)
 Dutee Chand (sprint runner)
 Jauna Murmu (sprint running, hurdler)
 Katulu Ravi Kumar (weightlifting)
 Srabani Nanda (sprint runner)
 Pramila Prava Minz (rowing)
 Pratima Puhan (rowing)
 Valena Valentina (karate)
 Kalpana Dash (Everest climber)
 Pramod Bhagat (Paralympian)

See also
 Lists of people from India by state
 List of Odia poets
 Odia people
 Odia literature
 Odia language

References

External links

Odissi dance at the Open Directory
History of Odissi

 
Odisha-related lists
Ethnic groups in India
Odisha
Writers
Odia-language writers